American Idol Season 3: Greatest Soul Classics is a soul music compilation that was released on April 27, 2004. It contains one cover song from each of the twelve finalists of the third season of American Idol and one ensemble.

The album debuted at No. 10 on the Nielsen Soundscan album chart and sold 55,300 the first week.  It was certified gold on August 4, 2004 for shipment of 500,000, but sold only 266,000 by 2006.

Track listing
 "Chain of Fools" (Aretha Franklin) – 3:17 Fantasia Barrino
 "Me and Mrs. Jones" (Billy Paul) –4:35 George Huff
 "I Heard It Through the Grapevine" (Gladys Knight and the Pips) – 3:23 Diana DeGarmo 
 "If You Don't Know Me By Now" (Harold Melvin & the Blue Notes) – 3:27 LaToya London
 "Neither One of Us (Wants to Be the First to Say Goodbye)" (Gladys Knight & the Pips) – 4:14 Jennifer Hudson 
 "You Make Me Feel Brand New" (The Stylistics) – 4:35 Amy Adams
 "(Sittin' On) the Dock of the Bay" (Otis Redding) – 2:58 Matthew Rogers 
 "Midnight Train to Georgia" (Gladys Knight & the Pips) – 3:23 Jasmine Trias 
 "My Girl" (The Temptations) – 3:04 Jon Peter Lewis 
 "Until You Come Back to Me (That's What I'm Gonna Do)" (Aretha Franklin) – 3:34 Camile Velasco 
 "Betcha by Golly Wow!" (The Stylistics) – 3:11 Leah LaBelle 
 "You Are Everything" (The Stylistics) – 2:39 John Stevens 
 "Ain't No Mountain High Enough" (Marvin Gaye & Tammi Terrell) – 2:42 American Idol Season 3 Finalists

References

American Idol compilation series
2004 compilation albums
2004 soundtrack albums